Philippe Vorbe (born September 14, 1947) is a former Haitian footballer who played as a midfielder for the Haiti national football team in the 1974 FIFA World Cup in West Germany. A legendary player in Haiti, he provided Emmanuel Sanon the pass that resulted in the famous goal that put an end to Italian goalkeeper Dino Zoff's  no-goal streak. Vorbe played for the New York Generals and Violette Athletic Club. He ascended from player to leader and is now the coach of Violette.

International career

Vorbe was described in a February 1974 Observer article by Hugh McIlvanney as a "tall, handsome white man of French extraction" and a "graceful midfield player" with "impressive skills".

Having qualified for the 1974 World Cup by first knocking out Puerto Rico in a play-off, then topping the final group in the capital Port-au-Prince, Haiti was drawn into a very difficult group featuring two-time champions Italy, future champions Argentina, and Poland, who managed third place in the tournament.

The most famous goal of Haiti's World Cup run occurred against Italy. The Azzurri had not let in a goal in 12 games prior to the World Cup, thanks to goalkeeper Dino Zoff. However, in the opening of the second half, Emmanuel Sanon shocked the Italians with the opening goal, thanks to a spot-on pass from teammate Philippe Vorbe. However this lead did not hold and Italy went on to win 3–1.

References

External links
 Philippe Vorbe NASL stats

1947 births
Living people
Sportspeople from Port-au-Prince
Haitian footballers
Haiti international footballers
Haitian people of French descent
1974 FIFA World Cup players
CONCACAF Championship-winning players
Expatriate soccer players in the United States
Haitian expatriate footballers
Haitian expatriate sportspeople in the United States
Ligue Haïtienne players
Violette AC players
National Professional Soccer League (1967) players
New York Generals (NPSL) players
New York Generals players
North American Soccer League (1968–1984) players
Association football midfielders